Hilarographa druidica is a species of moth of the family Tortricidae. It is found in India (Bombay).

References

Moths described in 1909
Hilarographini
Moths of Asia
Taxa named by Edward Meyrick